The Sycamore Stakes is a Grade III American Thoroughbred horse race for three-year-olds or older, over a distance of  miles on the turf held annually in October at Keeneland Race Course, Lexington, Kentucky during the autumn meeting.  The event currently carries a purse of $300,000.

History

The inaugural running of the event was on 12 October 1995 over a distance of  miles and was won by Frank Mansell's five-year-old Lindon Lime who was ridden by US Hall of Fame jockey Craig Perret. Lindon Lime started as the even money favorite and won finishingf strongly by  lengths in a time of 2:42.11 setting a new track record for the distance.

In 2001 the distance was reduced one furlong to  miles. The event was won by Rochester who in his career win the event two more times (2002, 2005) and placing third as well in 2004.

In 2015 the event was upgraded to a Grade III.

Due to extremely wet conditions, the Sycamore was run "off the turf" on the polytrack in 2011.  The event was also run at  miles, originally scheduled for  miles. The American Graded Stakes Committee determined that the race lose its grade for the 2013 running which was also run on the polytrack. 

Between 2001 and 2006 the Breeders' Cup sponsored the event which reflected in the name of the event.

Records
Speed record
 miles: 2:28.81  	Red Knight  (2020)
 miles (turf): 2:38.68 Royal Strand (IRE) (1999)
 miles (polytrack):  2:39.40 Sanagas (GER) (2011)

Margins
 lengths: Royal Strand (IRE) (1999)

Most wins:
 3 – Rochester (2001, 2002, 2005)

Most wins by a jockey:
 4 – Pat Day (1999, 2001, 2002, 2003)

Most wins by a trainer:
 5 – Jonathan E. Sheppard (2000, 2001, 2002, 2005, 2009)

Most wins by an owner:
 6 – Augustin Stable (2000, 2001, 2002, 2005, 2014, 2015)

Winners

Legend:

See also 
 List of American and Canadian Graded races

References

Open middle distance horse races
Turf races in the United States
Graded stakes races in the United States
Grade 3 stakes races in the United States
Recurring sporting events established in 1995
Keeneland horse races
1995 establishments in Kentucky